Tindwari is a town and a nagar panchayat in Banda district in the Indian state of Uttar Pradesh.

Geography
It has an average elevation of 114 metres (374 feet).

Demographics
 India census, Tindwari had a population of 9,544. Males constitute 54% of the population and females 46%. Tindwari has an average literacy rate of 53%, lower than the national average of 59.5%: male literacy is 64%, and female literacy is 41%. In Tindwari, 19% of the population is under 6 years of age.

References

Cities and towns in Banda district, India